Mervyn Derek Burden (4 October 1930 – 9 November 1987) was an English cricketer. Burden was a right-arm off break bowler and a right-handed tail-end batsman.

Burden initially had a trial with Hampshire in 1947, reportedly turning up with no pads or bat. His first delivery of his trial flew over the nets without bouncing and shattered a dining-room window.

Burden played first-class cricket for 11 seasons, making his debut in 1953 against Worcestershire. Over the next ten years he made 174 appearances for the club, taking 481 wickets with his off breaks. His batting yielded few results, with Burden making only one half century in his career, that being a score of 51 runs as a nightwatchman against Warwickshire in 1960. Burden helped Hampshire win the 1961 County Championship, taking 50 wickets during their first-ever title-winning campaign. His final first-class match for Hampshire came in the 1963 County Championship against Glamorgan.

Popular among both players and spectators, he was included in a 2005 list of Hampshire cricket cult figures. His obituary in Wisden declared, "The value of such a man is not to be estimated in figures." Tony Lewis said of him that "his humour was never extinguished by failure" and noted that John Arlott called Burden "salt of the cricketing earth". Arlott devoted a chapter to Burden in John Arlott's Book of Cricketers (Lutterworth Press, 1979).

Burden died in Whitchurch, Hampshire on 9 November 1987.

References

External links

1930 births
1987 deaths
Cricketers from Southampton
English cricketers
Hampshire cricketers